Chyavanprash, originally Chayavanaprasham, is a cooked mixture of sugar, honey, ghee, Indian gooseberry (amla) jam, sesame oil, berries and various herbs and spices. It is prepared as per the instructions suggested in Ayurvedic texts. Chyavanprash is widely sold and consumed in India as a dietary supplement.

Origin
Chyavanprash is an ancient formulation and product. Various ancient Indian texts like Mahabharata, Puranas etc., relate that Ashvin twins, who were Raja Vaidya (Royal Physicians) to Devas during Vedic times, first prepared this formulation for Chyavana Rishi at his Ashram on Dhosi Hill near Narnaul, Haryana, India, hence the name Chyavanprash. The first historically documented formula for chyavanprash appears in the Charaka Samhita, the ancient Ayurvedic treatise from the early first millennium BCE.

Taste and appearance
Chyavanaprash tastes sweet and sour at the same time. The taste is dominated by the flavors of honey, ghee (clarified butter) and amla, and the smell by ghee and other spices including sandalwood, cinnamon and cardamom.

Consumption
Chyavanaprash is usually consumed directly. It can also be consumed along with warm water.

Composition
The recipe of chyavanprash is mentioned in manuscripts written for ayurvedic method of treatment viz. Ashtangahridayam, Charakasamhita, Sangandharasamhita.  The number of herbs used may vary from 25 to 80 but the main ingredient of all chyavanprash is amla. Other chief ingredients are:

 Ashwagandha (Withania somnifera or Winter cherry)
 Asparagus (Asparagus racemosa)
 Amla
 Bamboo manna
 Blue Egyptian water lily (Makhana)
 Cardamom
 Chebulic myrobalan
 Chinese cinnamon
 Cinnamon bark
 Clove
 Indian rose chestnut
 Country mallow
 Feather foil plant (Phyllanthus niruri or Bhumiamalaki)
 Galls
 Ghee
 Giant potato (Ipomoea mauritiana or Kiribadu Ala)
 Giloy (Guduchi) (Tinospora cordifolia) 
 Honey
 Indian kudzu
 Irish root
 Liquorice
 Long pepper (Piper longum)
 Malabar nut (Seed of Adhatoda vasica)
 Nut grass
 Potassium sorbate
 Raisins
 Round zedoary
 Sandalwood
 Sesame oil
 Spreading hogweed (Boerhavia diffusa)
 Sugar
 Tiger's claw or Ice plant (Erythrina variegata)
 Wild black gram
 Wild green gram
All of the major brands of chyavanprash were determined to be safe with respect to heavy metal content as of 2011 by Consumer Voice.

References 

Dietary supplements
Dabur Group